Mikkeline Kierkgaard (born 25 May 1984) is a Danish former competitive figure skater. Competing for Denmark in ladies' singles, she qualified to the free skate at five ISU Championships and finished in the top ten at the 2000 European Championships. She later competed in pairs with Norman Jeschke for Germany.

Personal life 
Kierkgaard was born  in Hundested, Denmark. Her younger sister, Anemone Kierkgaard, was also a competitive skater.

Career 
Kierkgaard began skating at age three. She initially competed as a single skater in Denmark. She was a two-time Danish junior national champion and was the 2000 Danish national champion. Her 7th-place finish at the 2000 European Figure Skating Championships set a record as being the highest placement for a Danish lady at any ISU Figure Skating Championships, and was the first top-ten finish for a Danish lady since Ester Bornstein placed 8th at the 1934 European Championships.

Because of injury, Kierkgaard switched from single skating to pair skating. She teamed up with Norman Jeschke in 2002 to compete for Germany. They were the 2004 German bronze medalists but were unable to compete internationally that season due to International Skating Union rules regarding country changes. Their partnership eventually ended due to Kierkgaard's injuries.

In 2001, Kierkgaard was the skating double for Claire Danes in It's All About Love.

Programs

Ladies' singles

Pairs with Jeschke

Results

Ladies' singles for Denmark

Pairs with Norman Jeschke for Germany

References

External links 
Mikkeline Kierkgaard's Homepage
 
 
Mikkeline Kierkgaard / Norman Jeschke fanpage

1984 births
Living people
Danish female single skaters
German female pair skaters
People from Hundested
Sportspeople from the Capital Region of Denmark